Libochovany is a municipality and village in Litoměřice District in the Ústí nad Labem Region of the Czech Republic. It has about 600 inhabitants.

Administrative parts
The village of Řepnice is an administrative part of Libochovany.

References

Villages in Litoměřice District